The Great South Athletic Conference (GSAC) was an intercollegiate athletic conference affiliated with the NCAA’s Division III. Member institutions were located nationwide, but was originally based in the southeastern United States.

History
The Great South Athletic Conference was founded in 1999 as a group of National Collegiate Athletic Association (NCAA) Division III member institutions from the Southeast with similar academic and athletic interests. Charter members included Fisk University, LaGrange College, Maryville College, Piedmont College and Stillman College. In 2002, Huntingdon College and women’s colleges Agnes Scott College and Wesleyan College were granted membership. In 2003, Spelman College and Wesleyan (Ga.) were admitted to the GSAC on a provisional basis and given full membership status in 2005. Salem College, a women’s school in Winston-Salem, North Carolina, became the conference’s eighth member for the 2009-10 season. Covenant College, located on top of Lookout Mountain in northwest Georgia, joined the conference in spring 2010 and began playing in fall 2010, while completing its requirements for NCAA Division III provisional status. Stillman, a charter member, dropped out of the conference following the 2001-02 season, now currently competing in the NCAA Division II Southern Intercollegiate Athletic Conference (SIAC); while Fisk, another charter member, dropped out of the conference following the 2005-06 season, to compete in the Gulf Coast Athletic Conference (GCAC) of the National Association of Intercollegiate Athletics (NAIA).

Three schools (also charter members of the GSAC) left for the USA South Athletic Conference beginning with the 2012–13 season: Piedmont, LaGrange and Maryville. Pine Manor College and Trinity Washington University joined the conference in the 2012–13 season to replace those schools. Due to the lack of men's athletic programs in the GSAC, the conference stopped sponsoring men's sports championships at the end of the 2011–12 season.

On May 10, 2012, Covenant College and Huntingdon College announced plans to leave the Great South and join USA South Athletic Conference beginning in the 2013–14 season. In the 2012–13 season, the Covenant and Huntingdon women's sports competed as full members of the GSAC, while their men's sports competed as NCAA Division III independents.

On November 1, 2012, Spelman College announced that they would be dropping all intercollegiate sports at the end of the 2012–13 academic year.

On January 14, 2013, the GSAC announced that Mills College, Finlandia University, and the University of Maine at Presque Isle would join the GSAC in the 2013–14 season. Finlandia and Maine–Presque Isle are co-educational colleges. The women's sports joined the GSAC, while the men's sports at the two schools remained Division III Independents.

On May 6, 2015, the USA South Athletic Conference announced that Agnes Scott College, Salem College, and Wesleyan College would be leaving the GSAC and joining the USA South beginning in the 2016-2017 season.

On June 11, 2015, the GSAC announced that Mount Mary University and UC Santa Cruz would be joining the conference in women's soccer, volleyball, women's basketball, softball (Mount Mary only) and tennis (UC Santa Cruz only). The move was made effective immediately. Both schools were formerly affiliate members, playing tennis in the GSAC since 2013.

Following the move of Agnes Scott, Salem, and Wesleyan to the USA South, the GSAC dissolved in the summer of 2016. The GSAC held its last conference championships in April 2016.

Chronological timeline
 1999 - The Great South Athletic Conference (GSAC) was founded. Charter members included Fisk University, LaGrange College, Maryville College, Piedmont College and Stillman College, effective beginning the 1999-2000 academic year.
 2002 - Stillman left the GSAC to join the Division II ranks of the National Collegiate Athletic Association (NCAA) and the Southern Intercollegiate Athletic Conference (SIAC), effective after the 2001-02 academic year.
 2002 - Agnes Scott College and Huntingdon College joined the GSAC, effective in the 2002-03 academic year.
 2003 - Spelman College and Wesleyan College joined the GSAC as provisional members, effective in the 2003-04 academic year.
 2006 - Fisk left the GSAC to join the National Association of Intercollegiate Athletics (NAIA) as an Independent (which would later join the Gulf Coast Athletic Conference (GCAC), effective beginning the 2010-11 academic year), effective after the 2005-06 academic year.
 2009 - Salem College joined the GSAC, effective in the 2009-10 academic year.
 2010 - Covenant College joined the GSAC, effective in the 2010-11 academic year.
 2012 - LaGrange, Maryville and Piedmont left the GSAC to join the USA South Athletic Conference (USA South), effective after the 2011-12 academic year.
 2012 - Due to lack of finding possible candidate schools with men's athletics programs, the GSAC was forced to drop men's sports, thus becoming a women's sports athletic conference, effective in the 2012-13 academic year. Co-ed schools Covenant and Huntingdon remained in the GSAC for women's sports, while their men's sports went to compete as NCAA D-III Independents.
 2012 - Pine Manor College and Trinity Washington University joined the GSAC, effective in the 2012-13 academic year.
 2012 - Finlandia University joined the GSAC as an affiliate member for softball, effective in the 2013 spring season (2012-13 academic year).
 2013 - Three institutions left the GSAC to join their respective new home primary conferences: Covenant and Huntingdon to align with their respective men's athletics programs and join the USA South, and Spelman to discontinue its athletic program as the school announced that it would close, all effective after the 2012-13 academic year.
 2013 - The University of Maine at Presque Isle (Maine–Presque Isle or UMPI) and Mills College (with Finlandia upgrading to join for all sports) joined the GSAC, effective in the 2013-14 academic year. Only Finlandia and Maine–Presque Isle (UMPI) were the co-educational schools whose men's sports still competed as NCAA D-III Independents.
 2013 - Rust College joined the GSAC as an affiliate member for softball, effective in the 2014 spring season (2013-14 academic year).
 2014 - Mount Mary University and the University of California at Santa Cruz (UC Santa Cruz or UCSC) joined the GSAC as affiliate members for women's tennis, effective in the 2015 spring season (2014-15 academic year).
 2015 - Maine–Presque Isle (UMPI) and Trinity Washington left the GSAC to become NCAA D-III Independents, effective after the 2014-15 academic year.
 2015 - Rust left the GSAC as an affiliate member for softball, effective after the 2015 spring season (2014-15 academic year).
 2015 - Mount Marty and UC Santa Cruz (UCSC) had upgraded to join the GSAC for all sports, effective in the 2015-16 academic year.
 2016 - The GSAC ceased operations as an athletic conference, effective after the 2015-16 academic year; as many schools left to join their respective new home primary conferences, effective beginning the 2016-17 academic year: Agnes Scott, Salem (N.C.) and Wesleyan (Ga.) joined the USA South; while Finlandia, Mills, Mount Marty, Pine Manor and UC Santa Cruz returned to become NCAA D-III Independents.

Member schools

Full members

Final members
The GSAC had eight final full members before the conference dissolved, all but one were private schools:

Notes

Former members
The GSAC had ten other former full members during the conference's existence, all but one were private schools:

Notes

Former affiliate members
The GSAC had one former affiliate member that did not later become a full member during the conference's existence, which was also a private school:

Notes

Membership timeline

Sports
From the 2012–13 to 2015–16 academic years, the GSAC sponsored intercollegiate athletic competition in women's sports only: basketball, cross country, soccer, softball, tennis, golf, and volleyball.

References

 
Sports organizations established in 1999
Organizations disestablished in 2016
1999 establishments in the United States